The Brighton Twins (French: Les jumeaux de Brighton) is a 1936 French comedy film directed by Claude Heymann and starring Raimu, Michel Simon and Suzy Prim. It is based on the 1908 play of the same title by Tristan Bernard. Twins are separated at birth in 1890, with one being raised in the United States and the other in France. More than forty years later they encounter each other for the first time.

Cast
 Raimu as Alfred Beaugérard et les deux fils Achille  
 Michel Simon as Labrosse  
 Suzy Prim as Clémentine Beaugérard  
 Charlotte Lysès as Madame Tupin - La belle-mère  
 Pierre Finaly as L'avocat 
 Marcel Maupi as Le garde du corps  
 Jacques Bousquet as L'oncle d'Amérique  
 Georges Paulais as Le docteur Paulard  
 Mila Parély as Antoinette - La bonne de Nancy  
 Pierre Piérade as Le président du tribunal  
 Mansuelle as L'huissier  
 Lucienne Masset as La nourrice  
 Madeleine Milhaud as Madame Achille Beaugérard  
 Paul Velsa as Le contrôleur des passeports  
 Geneviève Sorya as La poule du garde du corps  
 Three Notes Singers as Trio chantant à Brighton  
 Jean Tissier as Roberdet  
 René Génin as L'encaustiqueur  
 Germaine Aussey as Nancy Le Bail 
 Émile Genevois as Le gamin  
 Albert Malbert as Le barman  
 Jane Pierson as La directrice du bureau de placement 
 Yvonne Yma as Une dame au tribunal

References

Bibliography 
 Crisp, Colin. Genre, Myth and Convention in the French Cinema, 1929-1939. Indiana University Press, 2002.

External links 
 

1936 films
1936 comedy films
French comedy films
1930s French-language films
Films directed by Claude Heymann
French films based on plays
Films set in 1890
Films set in Brighton and Hove
Films about twin brothers
Pathé films
French black-and-white films
Films based on works by Plautus
Works based on Menaechmi
1930s French films